Cate Natalie Campbell,  (born 20 May 1992) is a Malawian-born Australian competitive swimmer, and a current multiple world record holder, who won two bronze medals at the 2008 Summer Olympics, a gold medal at the 2012 Summer Olympics, a gold and a silver medal at the 2016 Summer Olympics and a gold medal at the 2020 Summer Olympics. She is the current world record holder in the Long Course 4 x 100 m Freestyle Relay with Team Australia and the short course 100 m freestyle. Campbell was one of the flagbearers for Australia at the Tokyo 2020 Olympics alongside basketball player Patty Mills.

She is coached by Simon Cusack at the Commercial Swimming Club.

Early life
Cate is the first of five children born to South African parents, Eric, an accountant, and Jenny, a nurse. She has four younger siblings (three sisters and one brother): Bronte, Jessica, Hamish, and Abigail. Her brother Hamish has severe cerebral palsy and requires around-the-clock care.

Jenny used to be a swimmer and taught her three daughters to swim, in the pool at the family's home. Cate also recalls swimming near Hippopotami in Lake Malawi as a small child. Lake Malawi is the second deepest lake in Africa. It was in this lake that her father, Eric, would go sailing on weekends. Campbell and her siblings were homeschooled as children. Her mother also frequently read the Bible to her, while she was growing up. The Campbells lived in a big house, with no TV. They had many pets, including turkeys, guinea pigs, dogs, cats, and chickens. Campbell describes every morning like "an Easter egg hunt; the chickens would lay eggs all around the house."

During her schooling, Campbell states she could not sing or dance, but swimming was something in which she excelled. She also stated she received top marks for public speaking at school. Aside from those, she claims she was an "average student".

The Campbells moved from Malawi to Australia in 2001 and it was soon after this that Campbell took up competitive swimming. She completed her secondary school studies at Kenmore State High School in Brisbane, Queensland. Her sister Bronte is also an Olympic swimmer and the pair competed in the same event at the 2012 Summer Olympics.

In 2007, she went to the Australian Youth Olympic Festival in Sydney and won two gold medals in the 50 metre individual freestyle and 4 × 100 metre freestyle relay. She followed this up in 2008 with a victory in the 50 metre freestyle at the Japan Open, beating compatriot Libby Trickett and setting new Australian and Commonwealth records with her time of 24.48 seconds.

Career

2008 Olympics
Cate was the fastest qualifier into the 50 metre freestyle semi-finals, after recording a time of 24.20 seconds. This placed her in Lane 4 in the semi-finals against the world record holder Libby Trickett. In the second semi-final Cate placed second in a time of 24.42 seconds, placing her in Lane 5 for the final. In the final, she placed third in a time of 24.17. She also won bronze as part of Australia's women's 4 x 100 metre freestyle relay team.

2009 World Championship
Despite doing a time trial of 53.40 seconds, with her 100-metre performance of 56.39 from 5 months earlier in March and having hip problems, she was scratched from the women's 4 × 100 metre freestyle. However, she still earned the right to swim the 50 metre freestyle from her runner-up swim at the world championships trials. In Rome she finished with a bronze, beating compatriot Libby Trickett and ending 0.02 of a second off the Commonwealth Record.

2012 Olympics
In 2010, Cate and her sister Bronte caught glandular fever; they worked against post-viral fatigue as they trained to qualify for the 2012 Summer Olympics in London. Cate Campbell was a member of the Australian team that won the gold medal in the 4 × 100 metre freestyle relay at the Games. Before the individual 50 metre event, she contracted acute pancreatitis. In the women's 50 metre freestyle she and Bronte swam in the same heat, finishing third and second respectively, and qualifying for the semi-final in tenth and ninth place respectively.

2013
At the 2013 Australian Swimming Championships she won gold in both the 50  and 100 metre freestyle events, qualifying for the 2013 World Aquatics Championships. At the World Championships, she teamed up with her sister Bronte, Emma McKeon and Alicia Coutts in the 4 × 100 metre freestyle relay where they won the silver medal, finishing 0.12 of a second behind the American team. On the sixth day of competition, Campbell won the 100 metre freestyle world title with a time of 52.34 seconds. Campbell finished ahead of Sarah Sjöström of Sweden and defending Olympic champion, Ranomi Kromowidjojo.

2015

At the 2015 World Championships in Kazan, she won gold in the 4 × 100 metre freestyle relay, beating the Dutch and US teams by a comfortable lead. On the 100 metre freestyle event she finished third, behind Bronte Campbell and Sarah Sjöström. At the 2015 Australian Short Course Swimming Championships in Sydney, she broke the short course 100 metre freestyle world record in a time of 50.91, becoming the first woman to go under 51 seconds.

2016
At the 2016 Australian Swimming Championships she won the 100 metre freestyle to qualify for the 2016 Summer Olympics. She broke the Australian record in the 50 metre freestyle in the semifinals with a time of 23.93, which was the fastest time ever in a textile swimsuit. She went on to win the final and qualify for the Olympics in the 50 metre freestyle, improving her time to 23.84. In addition, Campbell also qualified for the Olympic team in both the 4 × 100 m freestyle (winning gold in a new world-record time) & 4 × 100 m medley relays. At the 2016 Australian Grand Prix meet, she broke the long course 100 metre freestyle world record in a time of 52.06. This was 0.01 seconds faster than the previous world record set by Britta Steffen during the super suit era.

2016 Summer Olympics
At the 2016 Summer Olympics Campbell won a gold medal as a member of the Australian women's 4 × 100 m freestyle team. The team, which included Campbell's sister Bronte, set a world record time of 3:30.65. This was followed by a silver medal as a member of the women's 4 × 100 m medley team. In the Olympic final of the 100 m freestyle, Campbell was the favourite, however after leading at the first turn, she finished 6th in 53.24, despite breaking the Olympic record in the heats and semifinals with times of 52.78 and 52.71, respectively. She narrowly missed a medal in the 50 m freestyle final, finishing 5th.

2017
After the Rio Olympics, Campbell took 2017 off from swimming competitively in order to recover from disappointment. She used most of the year to do "normal things" other people her age might do, taking her first real break from training since the age of 9. At the 2017 Australian Short Course Swimming Championships she broke the 100 metre freestyle world record in a time of 50.25, improving the previous mark by 0.33 seconds.

2018
Campbell returned to competition for the Gold Coast Commonwealth Games, winning gold and breaking the world record in the women's 4 × 100m freestyle relay, alongside sister Bronte, Emma McKeon and Shayna Jack. She then won gold for the women's 50m freestyle, with a time of 23.78, breaking a Commonwealth record. She also won gold for the women's 50m butterfly, despite having no prior experience in the stroke. She stated she opted for the event to "shake things up" and "to try something new and different". Campbell claimed the silver medal for the 100m freestyle with a time of 52.69, touching behind her sister Bronte, who had a time of 52.27.

2021 
Campbell qualified for her 4th Olympics, Tokyo 2020, becoming the third Australian swimmer to do so, after Leisel Jones and Emily Seebohm. On 7 July 2021, she was announced as one of Australia's flagbearers for the Opening Ceremony, alongside basketball player, Patty Mills, and becoming the first Australian female swimmer to do so. Alongside Emma McKeon, Meg Harris, and sister Bronte, Campbell won gold in the women's 4 x 100m freestyle relay, again breaking Australia's previous record. This also marked the 3rd time Campbell has won gold in the same event. She then went on to win the bronze medal in the 100m freestyle, behind Emma McKeon (gold) and Hong Kong's Siobhan Haughey (silver).

On day 9 of the Olympics, Campbell finished 7th in the 50m freestyle final. Half an hour later, she and the Australian team won gold in the women's medley relay, alongside Kaylee McKeown, Chelsea Hodges and Emma McKeon.

Personal life
In 2015, Campbell opened up about her struggles with body image. She confessed that pressure from TV and magazine models made her want to be skinny, however it reached the point where she was getting sick. She read a chapter in Michael Phelps' book Beneath the Surface, where the line "skinny swimmers aren't good swimmers" stuck out in her head. Her mother encouraged her to see a dietitian, and now believes "the sum of your worth is so much more than what you look like".

On Campbell's Twitter profile, she identifies as an atheist. She previously identified as Christian in 2010 and 2011, stating that she needed to rely on God for her "strength and love". At the time her family was attending a local Baptist church in Brisbane.

Since 2011, Campbell has been studying a degree in Mass Communication at Queensland University of Technology. She has stated that she wants to pursue a career that combines her interest in the media industry with her love of sport, when she retires. She is a member of the QUT Elite Athlete program.

Until December 2016, Campbell lived with her sister Bronte. As of 2017, they are no longer housemates. She subsequently bought a house in Morningside, Queensland.

Campbell enjoys hiking, listening to music, newspaper crosswords, and brewing Kombucha. She also owns a kayak.

She is a supporter of Nexus Care, a not-for-profit organisation, that aims to improve the lives of those living in poverty in the northern suburbs of Brisbane.

In November 2018, Campbell revealed she had been diagnosed with a stage one melanoma that developed in a mole she had had her whole life and had to get it removed. She urged her fans to get regular skin checks, stating "an hour out of your day once or twice a year is all it takes". She has since been praised for raising awareness of skin cancer.

Results in major championships

Personal bests

Notes: WR = world record, CR = Commonwealth record, OC = Oceanian record, NR = national record

World records

Long course metres

 split 52.83 (2nd leg); with Tomaso D'Orsogna (1st leg), James Magnussen (3rd leg), Bronte Campbell (4th leg)
 split 52.16 (4th leg); with Bronte Campbell (1st leg), Melanie Schlanger (2nd leg), Emma McKeon (3rd leg)
 split 51.97 (4th leg); with Emma McKeon (1st leg), Brittany Elmslie (2nd leg), Bronte Campbell (3rd leg) 
 split 51.00 (4th leg); with Shayna Jack (1st leg), Bronte Campbell (2nd leg), Emma McKeon (3rd leg)
 split 52.24 (4th leg); with Bronte Campbell (1st leg), Meg Harris (2nd leg), Emma McKeon (3rd leg)

Short course metres

 split 23.63 (4th leg); with Robert Hurley (1st leg), Christian Sprenger (2nd leg), Alicia Coutts (3rd leg)
 split 23.23 (4th leg); with Robert Hurley (1st leg), Christian Sprenger (2nd leg), Alicia Coutts (3rd leg)
 split 23.28 (4th leg); with Robert Hurley (1st leg), Christian Sprenger (2nd leg), Alicia Coutts (3rd leg)
 split 23.50 (4th leg); with Tomaso D'Orsogna (1st leg), Regan Leong (2nd leg), Bronte Campbell (3rd leg)
 split 23.10 (3rd leg); with Tomaso D'Orsogna (1st leg), Travis Mahoney (2nd leg), Bronte Campbell (4th leg)

Olympic records

Long course metres

 split 53.19 (2nd leg); with Alicia Coutts (1st leg), Brittany Elmslie (3rd leg), Melanie Schlanger (4th leg)
 split 51.80 (4th leg); with Madison Wilson (1st leg ), Brittany Elmslie (2nd leg), Bronte Campbell (3rd leg)
 split 51.97 (4th leg); with Emma McKeon (1st leg), Brittany Elmslie (2nd leg), Bronte Campbell (3rd leg)
 split 52.24 (4th leg); with Bronte Campbell (1st leg), Meg Harris (2nd leg), Emma McKeon (3rd leg)
 split 52.11 (4th leg); with Kaylee McKeown (1st leg), Chelsea Hodges (2nd leg), Emma McKeon (3rd leg)

See also
 List of Olympic medalists in swimming (women)
 List of World Aquatics Championships medalists in swimming (women)
 List of Commonwealth Games medallists in swimming (women)
 World record progression 100 metres freestyle
 World record progression 4 × 100 metres freestyle relay

References

Australian Olympic Committee profile
"Meet the next teen queen", Sydney Morning Herald, 2 August 2008

External links

  (archive 2)
 
 
 
 
 
 

1992 births
Commonwealth Games gold medallists for Australia
Commonwealth Games silver medallists for Australia
Australian female freestyle swimmers
Living people
Malawian emigrants to Australia
Malawian people of British descent
Medalists at the 2008 Summer Olympics
Medalists at the 2012 Summer Olympics
Medalists at the 2016 Summer Olympics
Medalists at the 2020 Summer Olympics
Olympic gold medalists for Australia
Olympic silver medalists for Australia
Olympic bronze medalists for Australia
Olympic gold medalists in swimming
Olympic silver medalists in swimming
Olympic bronze medalists in swimming
Olympic swimmers of Australia
People from Blantyre
Recipients of the Medal of the Order of Australia
Sportswomen from Queensland
Swimmers at the 2008 Summer Olympics
Swimmers at the 2012 Summer Olympics
Swimmers at the 2014 Commonwealth Games
Swimmers at the 2016 Summer Olympics
Swimmers at the 2018 Commonwealth Games
Swimmers at the 2020 Summer Olympics
World Aquatics Championships medalists in swimming
Swimmers from Brisbane
World record holders in swimming
Commonwealth Games medallists in swimming
Universiade medalists in swimming
Australian atheists
Former Baptists
Queensland University of Technology alumni
Universiade gold medalists for Australia
Universiade bronze medalists for Australia
Medalists at the 2011 Summer Universiade
Medallists at the 2014 Commonwealth Games
Medallists at the 2018 Commonwealth Games